Kashirsky District is an administrative and municipal district (raion), one of thirty-six in Moscow Oblast, Russia. It is located in the south of the oblast.

Geography 
Its administrative center is the town of Kashira. 

The population was  70,774 (2002 Census);  The population of Kashira accounts for 59.6% of the district's total population.

Notable residents 

Fyodor Astakhov (1892–1966), Soviet Marshal of Aviation, born in Ledovskie Vyselki village
Dmitri Vishnevsky (born 1990), ice hockey player

References

Notes

Sources

Districts of Moscow Oblast